Five of a Kind is a 1938 American comedy film directed by Herbert I. Leeds and written by Lou Breslow and John Patrick. The film stars Jean Hersholt, Claire Trevor, Cesar Romero, Slim Summerville, Henry Wilcoxon and Inez Courtney. The film was released on October 14, 1938, by 20th Century Fox. The film follows the escalating rivalry between radio journalists Duke Lester (Romero) and Christine Nelson (Trevor) that culminates in a competition to cover the exploits of the famous Canadian quintuplets, the Wyatts, played by the Dionne quintuplets.

Plot
Reporters on rival newspapers, Christine Nelson (Claire Trevor) and Duke Lester (Cesar Romero), meet on the trail of a run-away heiress and engage in a series of tricks to get the scoop.

After being fired due to deliberate misinformation, Nelson gets a job as a radio interviewer setting her sights on the Dionne quintuplets. Lester gets wind of the interview, arrives first, and reignites the "war". Nelson wins this round.

To counter Nelson's popularity, Lester fabricates a story about sextuplets. Thinking she is breaking the story, Nelson talks on air to Lester's fake doctor. Other newshounds quickly expose the story as false, destroying a planned benefit for a New York orphanage-hospital.

When Lester discovers the impact of his actions, he works to repair the damage and save the benefit.

Cast
 Dionne quintuplets as Wyatt quintuplets 
 Yvonne Dionne as Yvonne 
 Cécile Dionne as Cécile 
 Marie Dionne as Marie
 Annette Dionne as Annette
 Emilie Dionne as Émelie 
 Jean Hersholt as Dr. John Luke
 Claire Trevor as Christine Nelson
 Cesar Romero as Duke Lester
 Slim Summerville as Jim Ogden
 Henry Wilcoxon as Dr. Scott Williams
 Inez Courtney as Libby Long
 John Qualen as Asa Wyatt
 Jane Darwell as Mrs. Waldron
 Pauline Moore as Elinor Kingsley
 Johnny Russell as Dickie
 Andrew Tombes as Dr. Bruno
 David Torrence as Sir Basil Crawford
 Marion Byron as Nurse Corday
 Hamilton MacFadden as Andrew Gordon
 Spencer Charters as Rev. Matthew Brand
 Charles D. Brown as Editor Crane

Production 
The Wyatt quintuplets in the movie are shown to live an idealized version of the life of the Dionne quintuplets. Shortly after their birth, the Dionne girls were made wards of the state and raised in a theme park type hospital situation which was across the street from the parents they were taken from. For the first nine years of their life, the Dionne quintuplets children were treated like a zoo attraction. While they were under state care, they made this movie and its predecessor, The Country Doctor, both featuring Jean Hersholt as their kindly caretaker, Dr. John Luke.

References

External links 
 
 
 

1938 films
20th Century Fox films
American comedy films
1938 comedy films
Films directed by Herbert I. Leeds
Dionne quintuplets
American black-and-white films
Films scored by Samuel Kaylin
1930s English-language films
1930s American films